Douglas County is a county located in the U.S. state of Washington. As of the 2020 census, its population was 42,938. The county seat is Waterville, while its largest settlement is East Wenatchee. The county was created out of Lincoln County on November 28, 1883 and is named for American statesman Stephen A. Douglas.

Douglas County is part of the Wenatchee, WA Metropolitan Statistical Area.

Geography

Geographic features
Columbia River

Major highways
 U.S. Route 2
 U.S. Route 97

Adjacent counties
Okanogan County – north
Grant County – south
Kittitas County – southwest
Chelan County – west

Demographics

2000 census
As of the census of 2000, there were 32,603 people, 11,726 households, and 8,876 families living in the county.  The population density was 18 people per square mile (7/km2).  There were 12,944 housing units at an average density of 7 per square mile (3/km2).  The racial makeup of the county was 84.65% White, 0.31% Black or African American, 1.09% Native American, 0.55% Asian, 0.10% Pacific Islander, 10.83% from other races, and 2.48% from two or more races.  19.73% of the population were Hispanic or Latino of any race. 18.0% were of German, 10.0% English, 9.3% United States or American and 7.8% Irish ancestry. 81.5% spoke English, and 17.7% Spanish as their first language.

There were 11,726 households, out of which 38.40% had children under the age of 18 living with them, 61.60% were married couples living together, 9.70% had a female householder with no husband present, and 24.30% were non-families. 20.00% of all households were made up of individuals, and 7.80% had someone living alone who was 65 years of age or older.  The average household size was 2.76 and the average family size was 3.16.

In the county, the population was spread out, with 29.50% under the age of 18, 8.20% from 18 to 24, 27.30% from 25 to 44, 22.40% from 45 to 64, and 12.70% who were 65 years of age or older.  The median age was 36 years. For every 100 females, there were 98.20 males.  For every 100 females age 18 and over, there were 96.00 males.

The median income for a household in the county was $38,464, and the median income for a family was $43,777. Males had a median income of $35,917 versus $24,794 for females. The per capita income for the county was $17,148.  About 11.20% of families and 14.40% of the population were below the poverty line, including 21.00% of those under age 18 and 6.90% of those age 65 or over.

2010 census
As of the 2010 census, there were 38,431 people, 13,894 households, and 10,240 families living in the county. The racial makeup of the county was 79.6% White, 1.1% American Indian, 0.7% Asian, 0.3% black or African American, 0.1% Pacific islander, 15.6% from other races, and 2.6% from two or more races. Those of Hispanic or Latino origin made up 28.7% of the population. In terms of ancestry, 20.2% were German, 11.2% were English, 9.4% were Irish, 6.0% were Norwegian, and 5.0% were American.

Of the 13,894 households, 37.2% had children under the age of 18 living with them, 57.8% were married couples living together, 10.7% had a female householder with no husband present, 26.3% were non-families, and 20.8% of all households were made up of individuals. The average household size was 2.75 and the average family size was 3.18. The median age was 36.8 years.

The median income for a household in the county was $48,708 and the median income for a family was $55,766. Males had a median income of $39,991 versus $31,706 for females. The per capita income for the county was $22,359. About 10.2% of families and 14.3% of the population were below the poverty line, including 22.0% of those under age 18 and 3.7% of those age 65 or over.

Communities

Cities
Bridgeport
East Wenatchee
Rock Island

Towns
Coulee Dam (partial)
Mansfield
Waterville (county seat)

Unincorporated communities
Leahy
Orondo
Douglas
Palisades
Withrow
Beebe

Ghost Towns
Alstown
Farmer
Saint Andrews
Touhery

Politics
Federally, Douglas County is represented primarily by Dan Newhouse (R) of the 4th while parts of East Wenatchee have been siphoned off into the 8th, represented by Democrat Kim Schrier. It is one of the most strongly Republican counties in the state in presidential elections, and has not voted for a Democratic candidate since 1964, in Lyndon B. Johnson's rout of Barry Goldwater.

See also
National Register of Historic Places listings in Douglas County, Washington
Mansfield Branch (Great Northern Railway)

Notes

References

Further reading
Available online through the Washington State Library's Classics in Washington History collection

External links

Douglas County web site
Douglas County photos

 
1883 establishments in Washington Territory
Populated places established in 1883
Wenatchee–East Wenatchee metropolitan area
Eastern Washington